The 1946 Vermont gubernatorial election took place on November 5, 1946. Incumbent Republican Mortimer R. Proctor ran unsuccessfully for re-election to a second term as Governor of Vermont, losing to Ernest W. Gibson, Jr. in the Republican primary. Gibson defeated Democratic candidate Berthold C. Coburn in the general election.

Republican primary

Results

Democratic primary

Results

General election

Candidates
Ernest W. Gibson, Jr., Secretary of the Vermont Senate
Berthold C. Coburn, member of the Democratic Party State Committee

Results

References

Vermont
1946
Gubernatorial
November 1946 events in the United States